Rhonda Blades Brown (born October 29, 1972) is a former professional basketball player. She was the first pick in the 1998 WNBA expansion draft. Blades was a 4-year starting point guard and captain at Vanderbilt University. She was a first round draft pick for the New York Liberty, starting her six-year career in the WNBA and abroad.

College
Rhonda Blades played basketball for Vanderbilt. During her four seasons (1992–95), she totaled 1,017 points and was named Honorable Mention All-American during her senior year. Blades completed a master's degree in Nursing (MSN) and RN from VUSN in 1996.

Vanderbilt statistics

Source

WNBA
Rhonda Blades played for the New York Liberty, Detroit Shock, and Washington Mystics. Drafted in the early days of the league, Brown became the first WNBA player to score a 3-point shot. Brown continued playing professionally in Israel and Turkey, winning the Israeli cup in 2000–2001.

WNBA per game stats

Regular season

|-
| style="text-align:left;"|1997
| style="text-align:left;"|New York
| 28 || 0 || 10.4 || .357 || .315 || .650 || 0.8 || 1.1 || 0.5 || 0.0 || 1.4 || 2.9
|-
| style="text-align:left;"|1998
| style="text-align:left;"|Detroit
| 29 || 2 || 11.7 || .256 || .240 || .483 || 1.1 || 1.4 || 0.4 || 0.0 || 1.4 || 2.3
|-
| style="text-align:left;"|Career
| style="text-align:left;"|2 years, 2 teams
| 57 || 2 || 11.1 || .304 || .279 || .551 || 0.9 || 1.2 || 0.5 || 0.0 || 1.4 || 2.6

Playoffs

|-
| style="text-align:left;"|1997
| style="text-align:left;"|New York
| 1 || 0 || 13.0 || — || — || — || 0.0 || 2.0 || 0.0 || 0.0 || 2.0 ||0.0

Life after Professional Basketball
After basketball, Blades became the head varsity girls' basketball coach at Brentwood Academy, in Brentwood, Tennessee. She has coached a winning program for 17 seasons (361-162 record), including 5 state championships and 4 more state championship appearances. She also teaches Anatomy and Health at Brentwood Academy, for which additional sessions were added to meet demand. Brown is married to Parke Brown (22 years), with two children, Blades (son, age 10) and Millie (daughter, age 14).

References

1972 births
Living people
American women's basketball coaches
American women's basketball players
New York Liberty players
Detroit Shock players
Sportspeople from Springfield, Missouri
Vanderbilt Commodores women's basketball players
Guards (basketball)